Chalai or Chalaion was a town in Phthiotis in ancient Thessaly. The town's name is not attested directly, but s extrapolated from its demonym, . 

Its site has been located at a place called Tsournati, where archaeological remains from the Archaic and Classical periods have been found.

References

Populated places in ancient Thessaly
Former populated places in Greece
Achaea Phthiotis
Ancient Greek archaeological sites in Thessaly